Pogonichthyinae is a subfamily of the freshwater fish family Leuciscidae, which contains the true minnows. Members of this family are known as American minnows or the North American (NA) clade of minnows. As the name suggests, all members of this family are found in North America (although they are not the only minnows native to North America, as Plagopterinae, Laviniinae, and Leuciscinae are also found there).

Genera 

 Agosia (longfin dace)
 Algansea (Mexican chubs)
 Aztecula (Aztec chub)
 Campostoma (stonerollers)
 Clinostomus (redside daces)
 Codoma (ornate shiner)
 Cyprinella (satinfin shiners)
 Dionda (desert minnows)
 Ericymba (longjaw minnows)
 Erimystax (slender chubs)
 Exoglossum (cutlips minnows)
 Hybognathus (silvery minnows)
 Hybopsis (bigeye chubs)
 Iotichthys (least chub)
 Luxilus (highscale shiners)
 Lythrurus (finescale shiners)
 Macrhybopsis (blacktail chubs)
 Mylocheilus (peamouth)
 Nocomis (hornyhead chubs)
 Notropis (eastern shiners)
 Opsopoeodus (pugnose minnow)
 Oregonichthys (Oregon chubs)
 Pararhinichthys (cheat minnow)
 Phenacobius (suckermouth minnows)
 Pimephales (bluntnose minnows)
 Platygobio (flathead chub)
 Pogonichthys (splittails)
 Pteronotropis (flagfin shiners)
 Rhinichthys (riffle daces, loach minnows) (including Tiaroga)
 Richardsonius (redside shiners)
 †Stypodon
 Tampichthys
 Yuriria

References

Fish subfamilies
Pogonichthyinae
Taxa named by Charles Frédéric Girard